Richard Murray (1831–21 November 1861) was an Australian cricketer. He played four first-class matches for New South Wales between 1855–56 and 1859–60.

See also
 List of New South Wales representative cricketers

References

External links
 

1831 births
1861 deaths
Australian cricketers
New South Wales cricketers
Cricketers from Sydney